Me and the Kid is a 1993 American comedy-drama film directed by Dan Curtis. It stars Danny Aiello, Alex Zuckerman, Joe Pantoliano, Cathy Moriarty, David Dukes, Anita Morris, Ben Stein, Demond Wilson and Abe Vigoda.

Plot
A couple of ex-cons, Harry (Danny Aiello) and Roy (Joe Pantoliano), break into a home expecting to find $250,000 in a safe, but come away empty-handed. They do, however, take 8-year-old Gary (Alex Zuckerman) with them, hoping that the boy's father will pay a ransom.

Harry forms a bond with Gary, who has multiple allergies, is home-schooled and has rarely been out in the world. Roy resents the kid-glove treatment of the boy and becomes at odds with his partner over what to do with him. In the end, things between Roy and Harry get violent, but Gary saves Harry's life. While Gary enjoys life with Harry much more than his home life, things get too dangerous and Harry is forced to leave him behind. However, Gary aids Harry in escaping from the authorities. Sometime later, Harry visits Gary at home and the two leave together once more, heading for Mexico to start a new life.

Cast
Danny Aiello as Harry
Alex Zuckerman as Gary
Joe Pantoliano as Roy
Cathy Moriarty as Rose
David Dukes as Victor Feldman
Anita Morris as Mrs. Feldman
Ben Stein as Fred Herbert
Demond Wilson as Agent Schamper
Abe Vigoda as Pawn Broker

Production
The film was shot in New York City and California, in October 1992.

References

External links

1990s English-language films
1990s American films
1993 films
1993 comedy-drama films
1993 independent films
American comedy-drama films
American independent films
Films about child abduction in the United States
Films about children
Films about families
Films about friendship
Films based on American novels
Films directed by Dan Curtis
Films shot in Mexico
Orion Pictures films